The 2022 Idaho House of Representatives elections took place as part of the biennial United States elections on November 8, 2022. Idaho voters elected state representatives in all 70 seats of the House, electing 2 state representatives in each of the 35 Idaho state legislative districts. State representatives serve two-year terms in the Idaho House of Representatives.

Following the previous election, Republicans held a 58-to-12-seat majority over Democrats.

Swing districts 

 Idaho's 15th legislative district
 Idaho's 26th legislative district
 Idaho's 29th legislative district

Retirements

Republicans
District 2B: Doug Okuniewicz: Retiring to run for state senate
District 5B: Caroline Nilsson Troy: Retiring
District 7A: Priscilla Giddings: Retiring to run for Lieutenant Governor
District 8A: Terry Gestrin: Retiring to run for state senate
District 8B: Dorothy Moon: Retiring to run for Secretary of State
District 10B: Gregory Chaney: Retiring to run for state senate
District 11B: Tammy Nichols: Retiring to run for state senate
District 12B: Rick Youngblood: Retiring
District 13B: Ben Adams: Retiring to run for state senate
District 15B: Codi Galloway: Retiring to run for state senate
District 21A: Steven Harris: Retiring
District 24B: Linda Wright Hartgen: Retiring to run for state senate
District 25A: Laurie Lickley: Retiring to run for state senate
District 25B: Clark Kauffman: Retiring
District 27A: Scott Bedke: Retiring to run for Lieutenant Governor
Districr 27B: Fred Wood: Retiring
District 28A: Randy Armstrong: Retiring
District 30A: Gary Marshall: Retiring
District 32A: Marc Gibbs: Retiring

Democrats
District 16A: John McCrostie: Retiring
District 26B: Sally Toone: Retiring
District 29B: James Ruchti: Retiring to run for state senate

Incumbents defeated in primaries

Republicans
District 4A: Jim Addis was defeated by Joe Alfieri.
District 4B: Paul Amador was defeated by Elaine Price.
District 9A: Ryan Kerby was defeated by Jacyn Gallagher.
District 9B: Scott Syme was defeated by fellow incumbent Judy Boyle in a redistricting race.
District 14B: Gayann DeMordaunt was defeated by Josh Tanner.
District 22A: Greg Ferch was defeated by fellow incumbent John Vander Woude in a redistricting race.
District 31A: Karey Hanks was defeated by Jerald Raymond.
District 34B: Ron Nate was defeated by Britt Raybould.
District 35B: Chad Christensen was defeated by Josh Wheeler.

Predictions

Summary of Results

Closest races 
Seats where the margin of victory was under 10%:
District 15
  
  
District 26
   
  gain  
District 29

Summary of Results by House District

References 

Idaho House of Representatives elections
House of Representatives
Idaho House of Representatives